Sanford is a city in York County, Maine, United States. The population was 21,982 in the 2020 census, making it the seventh largest municipality in the state. Situated on the Mousam River, Sanford includes the village of Springvale. The city features many lakes in wooded areas which attract campers.

Sanford is part of the Portland–South Portland–Biddeford, Maine metropolitan statistical area.

On November 6, 2012, Sanford voters approved a new charter to re-incorporate Sanford as a city and replace the town meeting format with a city council/mayor/strong manager form of government, along with other changes. The new charter took effect on January 1, 2013.  Sanford's new charter provides that the first mayor would be appointed from the ranks of Sanford's seven city councilors and serve interim for one-year period.  On January 8, 2013, Maura A. Herlihy was appointed as Sanford's first mayor.

In 2014, an elected-at-large mayor took office.  On November 5, 2013, Thomas Cote was elected as mayor. Beginning in 2016, the mayoral position began being elected at-large every two years during legislative election cycles.

History
Sanford is in the western portion of a tract of land purchased in 1661 from Abenaki Chief Fluellin by Major William Phillips, an owner of mills in Saco. First called Phillipstown, it was willed in 1696 by Mrs. Phillips to her former husband's son, Peleg Sanford. Settlement was delayed, however, by hostilities during the French and Indian Wars. In 1724, Norridgewock, an Abenaki stronghold on the Kennebec River, was destroyed by a Massachusetts militia. Subsequently, the region became less dangerous for white settlers, and Sanford was first settled in 1739. Incorporated a town in 1768, it was named after Peleg Sanford. Until 1794, Alfred was the town's North Parish.

The Mousam River provided water power for industry. In 1745, Capt. Market Morrison built a sawmill above Springvale. Following the Civil War, Sanford developed into a textile manufacturing center, connected to markets by the Portland and Rochester Railroad. Factories were built at both Springvale and Sanford villages. Products included cotton and woolen goods, carpets, shoes and lumber.

In 1867, British-born Thomas Goodall established the Goodall Mills at Sanford, after selling another mill in 1865 at Troy, New Hampshire which made woolen blankets contoured to fit horses. His factory beside the Mousam River first manufactured carriage robes and blankets. It would expand to make mohair plush for upholstering railroad seats, carpets, draperies, auto fabrics, military uniform fabric and Palm Beach fabric for summer suits.

The company's textiles were known for brilliant and fast colors and found buyers worldwide. From 1880 to 1910, the mill town's population swelled from 2,700 to over 9,000, some living in houses built by the company and sold to workers at cost. In 1914, the Goodall family built Goodall Park, a 784-seat roofed stadium, now a treasured historic site. They also helped build the library, town hall, hospital, airport, and golf club. A bronze statue was erected by the citizens of Sanford in 1917 to the memory of Thomas Goodall. His effigy has a place of honor in Central Park. George and Henrietta Goodall's daughter, Marion C. Goodall Marland, and her husband William Marland continued the Goodall family philanthropy. A dormitory at Nasson College bears the Marland's name.

In 1954, Burlington Mills, then the nation's largest textile firm, bought Sanford Mills. Local business owners began traveling the northeast, enticing employers to move to the area. In November 1955, NBC's Armstrong Circle Theatre dramatized Sanford's comeback on television in “The Town that Refused to Die”, starring Darren McGavin and Jason Robards. The story was later featured in LIFE magazine's feature on "Community Boosters" on August 5, 1957. It now has diversified industries, including manufacturing and biotech. When the federal government offered money in the 1960s for urban renewal to rehabilitate aging or blighted districts, more than thirty Sanford structures were razed. In Springvale, three of four corners were leveled. Nevertheless, much fine architecture from the town's prosperous mill era survived.

Sanford was the home of Belle Ashton Leavitt, the third woman attorney admitted to the Maine Bar Association. Leavitt was admitted to the Bar in 1900. Leavitt operated in partnership with attorney Fred J. Allen, her brother-in-law (Allen was married to Belle's sister Ida Leavitt), and member of the Maine Legislature.

The town gained national notoriety in 1984, when Scott Waterhouse, then age 18, strangled 12-year-old Gycelle Cote. Rumors of Satanism surrounded the case, and some of Waterhouse's personal belongings were deemed to be occult in nature. These included a copy of The Satanic Bible and a notebook carrying Satanic drawings and poetry. The furor culminated in several tabloid stories, national television coverage, and at least one headline referring to the town as "Terrortown!".

The town again gained national notoriety on November 9, 2009, when the Amber Alert system was first used in the state for 2-year-old Hailey Traynham, abducted by her father.

In 2003, Maine voters rejected a proposal to build a $650 million casino in South Sanford. The  development, ostensibly owned by the Penobscot and Passamaquoddy nations, would have included 4,000 slot machines, 180 gaming tables, a hotel, a  convention center and an 18-hole golf course. Proponents argued it would add 4,700 permanent jobs and direct 25% of its revenue to the state. Detractors predicted higher crime, traffic and an erosion of Maine's quality of life.

On June 23, 2017, the largest mill fire Sanford firefighters have ever battled erupted. The flaming five-story back building of the former Stenton Trust Mill complex at 13 River Street brought more than 100 firefighters from 20 communities to battle the blaze. The  complex, which was built in 1922 as a textile mill, includes two five-story brick and concrete buildings and a one-story connecting structure. Two days later, three boys from Sanford, two 13-year-olds and a 12-year-old, were charged with felony arson in connection with the fire. They pleaded guilty to criminal mischief and were placed on probation for a year.

Geography
Sanford is located at  (43.439925, −70.773304). Located near foothills, Sanford is drained by the Mousam River. Mt. Hope, elevation 680 feet (207 m) above sea level, is the city's highest point. The lowest elevation, which is approximately 140 feet (42.7 m) above sea level, is on the Mousam River at Old Falls Pond as it flows into Kennebunk.

Sanford borders the towns of Shapleigh, Acton, Alfred, Kennebunk, Wells, North Berwick, and Lebanon.

Climate
The climate is humid continental, similar to that of nearby towns such as Concord, New Hampshire.    The Köppen classification is Dfb.

Demographics
See also Sanford (CDP), Maine, South Sanford, Maine, and Springvale, Maine for village demographics.

2010 census
As of the census of 2010, 20,798 people, 8,500 households, and 5,417 families resided in the city. The city's racial makeup was 94.7% White, 0.6% African American, 0.4% Native American, 2.0% Asian, 0.3% from other races, and 2.0% from two or more races. Hispanic or Latino of any race made up 1.6% of the population.

There were 8,500 households, of which 30.6% had children under the age of 18 living with them, 44.7% were married couples living together, 13.1% had a female householder with no husband present, 5.9% had a male householder with no wife present, and 36.3% were non-families. Of all households, 28.9% were made up of individuals, and 11.2% had someone living alone who was 65 years of age or older. The average household size was 2.41 and the average family size was 2.91.

The median age in the city was 40.5 years. 22.6% of residents were under the age of 18; 8.2% were between the ages of 18 and 24; 25% were from 25 to 44; 29% were from 45 to 64, and 15.1% were 65 years of age or older. The gender makeup of the city was 47.9% male and 52.1% female.

2000 census
As of the census of 2000, there were 20,806 people, 8,270 households, and 5,449 families residing in the CDP. The racial makeup of the CDP was 95.68% White, 0.44% Black or African American, 0.31% Native American, 2.07% Asian, 0.02% Pacific Islander, 0.27% from other races, and 1.21% from two or more races. Hispanic or Latino of any race were 0.96% of the population.

There were 8,270 households, out of which 33.7% had children under the age of 18 living with them, 48.5% were married couples living together, 12.7% had a female householder with no husband present, and 34.1% were non-families. Of all households, 27.6% were made up of individuals, and 11.7% had someone living alone who was 65 years of age or older. The average household size was 2.48 and the average family size was 3.01.

In the CDP the population was spread out, with 26.7% under the age of 18, 8.1% from 18 to 24, 29.0% from 25 to 44, 21.8% from 45 to 64, and 14.4% who were 65 years of age or older. The median age was 37 years. For every 100 females, there were 93.5 males. For every 100 females age 18 and over, there were 90.0 males.

The median income for a household in the CDP was $34,668, and the median income for a family was $43,021. Males had a median income of $33,115 versus $24,264 for females. The per capita income for the CDP was $16,951. About 11.1% of families and 12.8% of the overall population were below the poverty line, including 17.0% of those under age 18 and 11.2% of those aged 65 or over.

Voter registration

Fire department
Sanford citizens are protected by Firefighter/EMT's working out of three fire stations located in Springvale, South Sanford, and Downtown Sanford.  3 Engines, 1 Ladder, and 1 Rescue are staffed 24 hours a day; 365 days a year. Authorized strength is 45 full-time fire personnel.  SFD also provides Emergency Medical Services.  All firefighters are required to have a Maine EMS license ranging from EMT-Basic to Paramedic. In 2007 SFD responded to 1,150 Fire Runs & 2,515 Medical Runs for a total of 3,665 emergencies.

School system
In 2018, Hutter Construction Co. workers built a new high school on a 127-acre campus in the center of town.  The construction cost was billed at $103 million, with the state covering the majority of the cost.  It is a career-focused school, separated into four wings, in which students select specialized courses geared towards their preferred future career.

Sites of interest
 Louis B. Goodall Memorial Library
 Sanford-Springvale Historical Society & Museum
 Goodall Park - Baseball stadium home to the Sanford Mainers, two-time champions of the New England Collegiate Baseball League
 Mousam River

Events
 Sanford International Film Festival—an annual event that specializes in independent film

Notable people

 Frank Augustus Allen, mayor of Cambridge, Massachusetts (1877)
 Randy Brooks, musician
 Michael Richard Cote, Bishop of Norwich, Connecticut
 Nick Curran, musician
 Vic Firth, musician, businessman
 Louis B. Goodall, businessman, U.S. congressman
 Jane Lord Hersom (1840–1928), physician, suffragist
 Sumner Increase Kimball, organizer of the United States Life-Saving Service, founder of Coast Guard Academy
 Peter Kostis, golf instructor, sportscaster
 Raymond Luc Levasseur, member of the United Freedom Front
 Franz Lidz, journalist and author of the memoir Unstrung Heroes
 Mike McGinnis, composer, musician
 Patrick James McGinnis, investor, author
 Freddy Parent, Major League Baseball shortstop (1899–1911)
 Lawrence Lee Pelletier, 16th president of Allegheny College
 Amédée Wilfrid Proulx, Catholic bishop
 Joe Riggs, mixed martial arts fighter, UFC veteran
 Rachel Schneider Olympic Runner
 Charles A. Shaw, 19th-century politician, inventor 
 John Storer, the namesake of Storer College
 John Tuttle, Maine state legislator

References

Further reading
 A Tour of Sanford in 1900, Maine Memory Network

External links

 City of Sanford & Village of Springvale, Maine

 
1661 establishments in the Thirteen Colonies
Cities in Maine
Cities in York County, Maine
Populated places established in 1661
Portland metropolitan area, Maine